Halopseudomonas is a genus of pseudomonad bacteria.

Species
The genus Halopseudomonas comprises the following species:
 Halopseudomonas aestusnigri (Sánchez et al. 2014) Rudra and Gupta 2021
 Halopseudomonas bauzanensis (Zhang et al. 2011) Rudra and Gupta 2021
 Halopseudomonas formosensis (Lin et al. 2013) Rudra and Gupta 2021
 Halopseudomonas gallaeciensis (Mulet et al. 2018) Rudra and Gupta 2021
 Halopseudomonas litoralis (Pascual et al. 2012) Rudra and Gupta 2021
 Halopseudomonas oceani (Wang and Sun 2016) Rudra and Gupta 2021
 Halopseudomonas pachastrellae (Romanenko et al. 2005) Rudra and Gupta 2021
 Halopseudomonas pelagia (Hwang et al. 2009) Rudra and Gupta 2021
 Halopseudomonas pertucinogena (Kawai and Yabuuchi 1975) Rudra and Gupta 2021
 Halopseudomonas sabulinigri (Kim et al. 2009) Rudra and Gupta 2021
 Halopseudomonas salegens (Amoozegar et al. 2014) Rudra and Gupta 2021
 Halopseudomonas salina (Zhong et al. 2015) Rudra and Gupta 2021
 Halopseudomonas xiamenensis (Lai and Shao 2008) Rudra and Gupta 2021
 Halopseudomonas xinjiangensis (Liu et al. 2009) Rudra and Gupta 2021
The following species belong to Halopseudomonas but have not formally been transferred, yet:
 Pseudomonas abyssi Wei et al. 2018
 "Pseudomonas jilinensis" Wang et al. 2020
 "Pseudomonas laoshanensis" Wang et al. 2021
 "Pseudomonas nanhaiensis" Pang et al. 2021
 Pseudomonas neustonica Jang et al. 2020
 Pseudomonas phragmitis Li et al. 2020
 Pseudomonas populi Anwar et al. 2016
 Pseudomonas profundi Sun et al. 2018
 Pseudomonas saliphila Zhang et al. 2021
 "Pseudomonas saudimassiliensis" Azhar et al. 2017
 "Pseudomonas yangmingensis" Wong and Lee 2014

References

Pseudomonadales
Bacteria genera